Chinese export recalls may refer to:

2007 Chinese export recalls
2008 Chinese heparin adulteration